Hubert Nelson may refer to:

Hub Nelson (1907–1981), ice hockey player
Hubert Nelson of Nelstone's Hawaiians, who originally recorded Just Because (Nelstone's Hawaiians song)

See also
Bert Nelson (disambiguation)